Abbeville, formerly Abbeyville House, is an 18th-century country house in the townland of Abbeyville, civil parish of Kinsealy, within the traditional County Dublin, Ireland. It is best known as the home of Charles Haughey during his years as Taoiseach.  The grounds contain streams, a pond and the site of a long-closed brewery.

History
Richard Montgomery (1738–1775) grew up in the original house. It was altered and enlarged by James Gandon for John Beresford c.1790.  It consists of two storeys over a basement; the front has seven bays, flanked by two wide curved bows, and is further prolonged by single-storey one-bay wings. The house belonged to the Cooper family from 1815 until the mid-20th century; in 1969 it was bought by Charles J Haughey, then a minister, who became Taoiseach in 1979.

In 2003, after his retirement and disgrace, Haughey sold it to Manor Park Homes, which intended to redevelop it after his death, which occurred in 2006. Manor Park Homes went bankrupt during the Irish financial crisis, and in 2012, the house was offered for sale at a guide price of €7.5 million, about a fifth of the 2003 price. It was purchased in 2013 by a Japanese hotel-owning family.

Parts of the Abbeville estate were separated to provide sites for homes for members of the Haughey family, including his widow, and these remain in family hands.

Access
For most of recent history, the house and grounds were almost wholly private.  Under the previous property tax regime, it was possible for Abbeville to be exempt if the house was open one day a year, a requirement fulfilled by events on the annual Irish Cancer Society Daffodil Day; the much more extensive opening required to avoid inheritance tax was not done.

Sources
M. Bence-Jones, A guide to Irish country houses, Constable, 1990, p. 1
B. De Breffny & R. ffolliot, The houses of Ireland, Thames & Hudson, 1984, p. 168
J. O'Brien & D. Guinness, Great Irish houses and castles, Weidenfeld & Nicolson, 1992, pp. 106–107

References

Buildings and structures in Fingal
Charles Haughey
Georgian architecture in Ireland
Houses in the Republic of Ireland
Buildings listed on the Fingal Record of Protected Structures